The World University American Football Championship is an international college American football competition sponsored by the International University Sports Federation (FISU) and sanctioned by the International Federation of American Football (IFAF). 

The 1st World University American Football Championship was held from May 1 to May 11, 2014 in Uppsala, Sweden.

The 2020 and 2022 championships were cancelled due to the COVID-19 pandemic. From 2022, the Championship will change formats, with university teams participating rather than National.

Results

References

 
IFAF competitions
American Football